is a passenger railway station located in the Handa neighborhood of the town of Tsurugi, Mima District, Tokushima Prefecture, Japan. It is operated by JR Shikoku and has the station number "B19".

Lines
Only local trains stop at the station.

Layout
The station consists of a side platform serving a single track. On the other side of the side platform, the traces of a former track bed can be seen, showing that it was once an island platform but track 1 has now been removed. The station building is unstaffed and serves only as a waiting room. A path and ramp leads to the platform. A shop opposite the station sells some types of tickets as a kan'i itaku agent.

Adjacent stations

History
With the privatization of Japanese National Railways (JNR), the successor to JGR, on 1 April 1987, Awa-Handa came under the control of JR Shikoku. On 1 June 1988, the line was renamed the Tokushima Line.

Surrounding area
Tsurugi Municipal Handa Hospital
Yoshino River
Japan National Route 192

See also
 List of Railway Stations in Japan

References

External links

 JR Shikoku timetable

Railway stations in Tokushima Prefecture
Railway stations in Japan opened in 1914
Tsurugi, Tokushima